Montreuil–Hôpital ( is a future station on line 9 and 11 of the Paris Métro. The station will serve the André Grégoire hospital in Montreuil.

Paris Métro line 9
Paris Métro line 11
Paris Métro stations in Montreuil, Seine-Saint-Denis
Future Paris Métro stations
Railway stations scheduled to open in 2023